Allen S. Baker (January 12, 1842 near what is now Evansville, Wisconsin – January 1916), was a member of the Wisconsin State Assembly.

Background

During the American Civil War, he served with the 2nd Wisconsin Volunteer Infantry Regiment. He died of influenza.

His son, John Baker, would also become a member of the Assembly.

Assembly career
Baker was a member of the Assembly during the 1905 and 1907 sessions. He was a Republican.

References

People from Evansville, Wisconsin
Republican Party members of the Wisconsin State Assembly
People of Wisconsin in the American Civil War
Union Army soldiers
American Congregationalists
1842 births
1916 deaths
Deaths from influenza
19th-century American politicians